The ninth season of Chicago Fire, an American drama television series with executive producer Dick Wolf, and producers Derek Haas and Matt Olmstead, was ordered on February 27, 2020, by NBC. The season premiered on November 11, 2020.

Cast and characters

Main cast 
 Jesse Spencer as Captain Matthew Casey, Truck Company 81
 Taylor Kinney as Lieutenant Kelly Severide, Squad Company 3
 Kara Killmer as Paramedic in Charge Sylvie Brett, Ambulance 61
 David Eigenberg as Lieutenant Christopher Herrmann, Engine Company 51
 Joe Minoso as Firefighter Joe Cruz, Squad Company 3
 Christian Stolte as Firefighter Randy "Mouch" McHolland, Truck Company 81
 Miranda Rae Mayo as Firefighter/Lieutenant Stella Kidd, Truck Company 81
 Alberto Rosende as Firefighter Candidate Blake Gallo, Truck Company 81
 Daniel Kyri as Firefighter Darren Ritter, Engine Company 51
 Adriyan Rae as Paramedic Gianna Mackey, Ambulance 61
 Eamonn Walker as Chief Wallace Boden, Battalion 25

Recurring characters 
 Randy Flagler as Firefighter Harold Capp, Squad Company 3
 Anthony Ferraris as Firefighter Tony Ferraris, Squad Company 3
 Jon Ecker as Lieutenant Greg Grainger
 Hanako Greensmith as Paramedic Violet Mikami, Ambulance 61
 Katelynn Shennett as Kylie Estevez

Crossover characters 
 Marina Squerciati as Officer Kim Burgess
 Amy Morton as Desk Sergeant Trudy Platt
 Yaya DaCosta as Nurse April Sexton
 Nick Gehlfuss as Dr. Will Halstead
 Patrick John Flueger as Officer Adam Ruzek

Episodes

Production

Casting
On April 16, 2020, it was announced that Annie Ilonzeh, who portrayed Paramedic Emily Foster, would depart the series after two seasons. On August 31, 2020, it was announced that recurring cast member Daniel Kyri who portrays Firefighter candidate Darren Ritter since the seventh season was promoted to series regular for season nine. On September 14, 2020, it was announced that Adriyan Rae was joining the cast as series regular Paramedic Gianna Mackey. Rae subsequently departed the cast following the season's ninth episode, showrunner Derek Haas stated that she left the series for personal reasons but that the possibility was open for her to return in a later episode. It was announced on March 19, 2021, that Hanako Greensmith, who had previously recurred as Violet Mikami would return in a recurring capacity to replace Rae's character as 51's latest paramedic. Former series regular Monica Raymund was set to return towards the end of the season but was unable to due to COVID restrictions.

Filming
Season 9 began filming October 6, 2020 amid the COVID-19 pandemic. The season contained 16 episodes. On November 11, 2020, it was reported that the ninth season had suspended production for two weeks due to multiple positive COVID-19 tests.

Ratings

References

External links
 
 

2020 American television seasons
2021 American television seasons
Chicago Fire (TV series) seasons
Television productions postponed due to the COVID-19 pandemic
Television shows about the COVID-19 pandemic